Hosea 9 is the ninth chapter of the Book of Hosea in the Hebrew Bible or the Old Testament of the Christian Bible. This chapter contains the prophecies attributed to the prophet Hosea son of Beeri, about the distress and captivity of Israel for their sins, especially their idolatry. It is a part of the Book of the Twelve Minor Prophets.

Text 
The original text was written in Hebrew language. This chapter is divided into 17 verses.

Textual witnesses
Some early manuscripts containing the text of this chapter in Hebrew are of the Masoretic Text tradition, which includes the Codex Cairensis (895), the Petersburg Codex of the Prophets (916), Aleppo Codex (10th century), Codex Leningradensis (1008). Fragments containing parts of this chapter in Hebrew were found among the Dead Sea Scrolls, including 4Q82 (4QXIIg; 25 BCE) with extant verses 1–4, 9–17.

There is also a translation into Koine Greek known as the Septuagint, made in the last few centuries BCE. Extant ancient manuscripts of the Septuagint version include Codex Vaticanus (B; B; 4th century), Codex Alexandrinus (A; A; 5th century) and Codex Marchalianus (Q; Q; 6th century).

Verse 9
 They have deeply corrupted themselves,
 as in the days of Gibeah:
 therefore he will remember their iniquity,
 he will visit their sins.
 "As in, the days of Gibeah": refers to the abominable acts to the concubine of a Levite (Judges 19), that  almost brought the tribe of Benjamin into extinction, except six hundred men.

Verse 11
 As for Ephraim, their glory shall fly away like a bird,
 from the birth, and from the womb, and from the conception.
"Fly away like a bird": The "double fruitfulness" of Ephraim because of the fertile land and the multiplication of their population;  was to vanish quickly and entirely, like birds swiftly fly out of sight. The calamity is further expressed in anti-climactic way - no child-bearing, no pregnancy, no conception (cf. .

See also

 Assyria
 Baal-Peor
 Egypt
 Ephraim
 Gibeah
 Gilgal
 Israel
 Memphis
 Samaria
 Tyre

Related Bible parts: Numbers 25, Judges 19, Hosea 6, Hosea 7, Hosea 8

Notes

References

Sources

External links

Jewish
Hosea 9 Hebrew with Parallel English
Hosea 9 Hebrew with Rashi's Commentary

Christian
Hosea 9 English Translation with Parallel Latin Vulgate

09
Phoenicians in the Hebrew Bible